

Arthropods

Insects

References

1840s in paleontology
Paleontology
Fossil taxa described in 1849